Mandisa Makesini is a South African politician who has been a member of the National Assembly of South Africa since February 2023, representing the Economic Freedom Fighters party. She previously served in the Free State Provincial Legislature. Makesini is a former provincial chairperson of the EFF.

Political career
Makesini was elected to the Free State Provincial Legislature in the 2014 general election alongside Jacob Tshabalala as one of two members of the Economic Freedom Fighters . At the EFF's provincial conference in September 2018, Makesini was elected provincial chairperson of the EFF, defeating incumbent Kgotso Morapela by three votes. On her election, Makesini said that it was a sign that patriarchy was being defeated. 

Makesini was re-elected to a second term in the provincial legislature in 2019. She unsuccessfully sought re-election as EFF provincial chairperson at the party's conference in November 2022, losing to Mapheule Liphoko in a vote that went 343 for Liphoko and 278 votes for Makesini. EFF President Julius Malema lamented her loss, criticising the delegates for not electing a woman to be provincial chairperson.

Makesini resigned from the provincial legislature in January 2023 and was replaced by Liphoko. She was subsequently sworn in as a member of the National Assembly of South Africa on 8 February 2023.

References

Living people
Year of birth missing (living people)
Sotho people
Economic Freedom Fighters politicians
Members of the Free State Provincial Legislature
Women members of provincial legislatures of South Africa
Members of the National Assembly of South Africa
Women members of the National Assembly of South Africa